Ó Seachnasaigh, O'Shaughnessy, collectively Uí Sheachnasaigh, clan name Cinél nAedha na hEchtghe, is a family surname of Irish origin. The name is found primarily in County Galway and County Limerick. Their name derives from Seachnasach mac Donnchadh, a 10th-century member of the Uí Fiachrach Aidhne, which the Ó Seachnasaigh were the senior clan of. The town of Gort, Ireland, was the main residence of the family since at least the time of their ancestor, King Guaire Aidne mac Colmáin.

Naming conventions

History

Up until the late 17th century the Ó Seachnasaighs held the sub-district of Uí Fiachrach Aidhne known as Cenél Áeda na hEchtge (modern Irish, Cinéal nAedha na hEchtghe), meaning "kindred of Aedh of the Slieve Aughty", which was also their clan name. Cinéal nAedha na hEchtghe / Kinelea consisted roughly of the civil parishes of Beagh, Kilmacduagh and Kiltartan and also parts of the civil parishes of Kibeacanty and Kilthomas. Their closest related kinsmen were the Ó Cathail / O Cahill clan, originally chiefs of eastern Kinelea, and the other clans of Uí Fhiachrach Aidhne the most prominent of which were the Ó hEidhin / O Hynes, Ó Cléirigh / O Cleary and Mac Giolla Cheallaigh / Kilkelly septs. Up until the mid-17th century, the O'Hynes clan were still styled lords of Uí Fhiachrach Aidhne even though the Ó Seachnasaighs had become more powerful than their kinsmen during this century. In the 1690s, Captain Roger O'Shaughnessy had his lands confiscated for supporting the Jacobite cause against William of Orange, with the lands going to Sir Thomas Prendergast, 1st Baronet. A legal battle raged on into the first half of the 18th century between the Ó Seachnasaigh and the Prendergasts, the family who were granted the lands, with the Ó Seachnasaigh eventually losing the case. The senior line of the Ó Seachnasaighs may have died out in the 1900s.

O'Shaughnessy castles include Gort Castle, Fiddaun Castle, Ardamullivan Castle, Newtown Castle, Derryowen, which is just inside the County Clare border, Ballymulfaig, and a castle on one of the islands in Lough Cutra. According to a list naming the castles of County Galway and their owners, drawn up in 1574 by the English administration in Ireland, Islandmore Castle (now Thoor Ballylee) was listed as being owned by a John O'Shaughnessy.

The last de facto Ó Seachnasaigh lord of Kinelea died at Gort after returning home from the Battle of Aughrim on 12 July 1691. Thousands of bearers of the name still survive both in their homeland and further abroad.

Notable O'Shaughnessys
Notable people with this surname include:

Andrew O'Shaughnessy (historian), historian
Andrew O'Shaughnessy (hurler) (born 1984), Irish hurler
Andrew O'Shaughnessy (politician) (1866–1956), Irish politician and Industrialist
Arthur O'Shaughnessy (1844–1881), British poet and herpetologist
Barney O'Shaughnessy (1912–2007), Australian cricketer
Bob O'Shaughnessy (1921–1995), American basketball player
Daniel O'Shaughnessy (born 1994), Finnish footballer
Darren O'Shaughnessy (born 1972), Irish author, nom de plume Darren Shan
Edward O'Shaughnessy (1860–1885), English cricketer
Eileen O'Shaughnessy (1905–1945), the first wife of George Orwell
James O'Shaughnessy (born 1960), American author and investor
James O'Shaughnessy, Baron O'Shaughnessy (born 1976), British politician
Margaret Heckler (born 1931, Margaret Mary O'Shaughnessy), US lawyer and politician
Michael O'Shaughnessy (1864–1934), Irish civil engineer
Nicholas O'Shaughnessy, professor, author and political commentator
Patrick O'Shaughnessy (born 1993), Finnish footballer
Roger O'Shaughnessy (died 1690), Captain in the Army of James II of England
Ryan O'Shaughnessy (born 1992), Irish singer-songwriter
Tam O'Shaughnessy (born 1952), American author and educator
Terrence J. O'Shaughnessy, general, United States Air Force 
Tony O'Shaughnessy (born 1930), Irish hurler
Thomas O'Shaughnessy (1850–1933), Recorder of Dublin
Sir Roger O'Shaughnessy of Kinelea (died 1569) 
William O'Shaughnessy (1673–1744), Major-General and Chief of the Name
William Brooke O'Shaughnessy (1809–1889), Irish toxicologist (introduced medical cannabis in Europe), chemist and inventor (telegraph)

See also
 Shaughnessy (disambiguation)
 Richard Michael Levey (1811–1899), born O'Shaughnessy, changed to his mother's maiden name Levey
 Uí Fiachrach Aidhne
 Irish nobility

Notes
 Some with relation to the O'Shaughnessy clan may spell it O'Shaughnessey or Shaughnessy.

References
John O'Donovan, " The Descendants of the Last Earls of Desmond", Ulster Journal of Archaeology, Volume 6, 1858. (contains passage regarding the knights O'Shaughnessy of Kinelea)
John O'Donovan. The Genealogies, Tribes, and Customs of Hy-Fiachrach. Dublin: Irish Archaeological Society. 1844. Pedigree of O'Shaughnessy, pp. 372–91
 Robert S. Rait. The Story of an Irish Property. Oxford: The University Press. 1908. Chapter III: The O'Shaughnessys, pp. 42–65

External links
 O'Shaughnessy family pedigree at Library Ireland

Surnames
Irish families
O'Shaughnessy family
Surnames of Irish origin
Gaels